South Carolina Hall Of Fame recognizes contemporary and past citizens of South Carolina who made outstanding contributions to the state's heritage and progress. The Hall of Fame is physically located in the Myrtle Beach Convention Center.

The Hall of Fame was originally dedicated in 1973 by Governor John C. West, and was signed into law as the official hall of fame by Governor Jim Hodges in 2001.The South Carolina State Library houses DVDs produced by South Carolina ETV that highlight the inductees. 

In order to be eligible, nominees can include those originally from South Carolina who obtained recognition, or non-residents who made an impact in the state. At least one living and one deceased citizen is inducted each year.

Inductees

References 

South Carolina-related lists
Halls of fame in South Carolina
Lists of people from South Carolina
State halls of fame in the United States